Kazimierz Fiałka (2 July 1907 – 25 September 1970) was a Polish long-distance runner. He competed in the marathon at the 1936 Summer Olympics.

References

1907 births
1970 deaths
Athletes (track and field) at the 1936 Summer Olympics
Polish male long-distance runners
Polish male marathon runners
Olympic athletes of Poland
Sportspeople from Kraków
Polish Austro-Hungarians